The Blueberry River is a tributary of the Shell River, approximately twenty miles (30 km) long, in north-central Minnesota in the United States.  Via the Shell and Crow Wing Rivers, it is part of the watershed of the Mississippi River, draining a rural area.

The river's name is a translation from its name in the Ojibwe language.

Geography
The Blueberry River rises in Green Valley Township in southeastern Becker County and flows generally southeastwardly. It flows for a short distance in southwestern Hubbard County and enters northwestern Wadena County, collecting the Kettle River and passing through the city of Menahga.  It flows into Blueberry Lake on the Shell River in Blueberry Township in Wadena County, approximately two miles (3 km) north of Menahga.  The Blueberry River flows in the Northern Lakes and Forests ecoregion, which is characterized by conifer and hardwood forests on flat and rolling till plains and outwash plains.

See also
List of rivers in Minnesota

References and notes

Rivers of Minnesota
Rivers of Becker County, Minnesota
Rivers of Hubbard County, Minnesota
Rivers of Wadena County, Minnesota
Tributaries of the Mississippi River